Rinaldo Fioramonte Martino (6 November 1921 – 15 November 2000) was an Italian Argentine forward who played for both the Argentine and the Italy national football teams. Usually a forward, Martino was a player known for his lethal combination of goal scoring ability, playmaking skills and technique.

Club career
Martino was signed by San Lorenzo de Almagro in 1941 at the age of 19 from Belgrano de Rosario. He made his debut in 1941 against Newell's Old Boys and in 1942 he became the top scorer in the Argentine Primera netting 25 goals in 30 games. In 1946 the team won the Primera División championship.

In 1949 Martino moved to Italy joining Juventus and helping them to record their first championship since the 1930s. During his time in Italy he made one appearance for the Italy national team.

Martino then moved to Uruguay to play for Nacional helping them to win the Uruguayan Championship. In 1951 Martino returned to Argentina to play for Boca Juniors but he was sold back to Nacional in 1952 for 300,000 pesos. He played there until 1953, helping the team to win another Uruguayan league title and several other minor titles. In 1953, Nacional released his pass, and Martino went to São Paulo FC, for a period of testing during the Rio-São Paulo Tournament. After five games, he didn't like it and was released. Still in 1953 he joined C.A. Cerro who were his last club.

International career

Martino played for Argentina in the 1940s, he made his debut in 1942 in a 4–1 win over Uruguay. He was part of the Argentina squads that won the Copa América in 1945 and 1946. During his time in Italy he also made a single appearance for the Italy national team.

After retirement
In 1964 he served as the president of the Argentine ex-footballers mutual society.

Martino's love of Argentine Tango led him to establish a Casa Porteño called Caño 14 in the 1960s which featured traditional tango music for 18 years. He died in Buenos Aires in 2000 at the age of 79.

Honours

Club
 San Lorenzo
Primera División Argentina: 1946

 Juventus
Serie A: 1949–50

 Nacional
Uruguayan Championship: 1950

 Nacional
Uruguayan Championship: 1952

International
 Argentina
Copa América: 1945, 1946

See also
Oriundo

References

External links

Juventus statistics 
Futbol5 profile 

AFA profile 
Player profile 

1921 births
2000 deaths
Footballers from Rosario, Santa Fe
Argentine footballers
Association football forwards
San Lorenzo de Almagro footballers
Juventus F.C. players
Boca Juniors footballers
Club Nacional de Football players
C.A. Cerro players
Argentina international footballers
Italy international footballers
Dual internationalists (football)
Serie A players
Argentine Primera División players
Uruguayan Primera División players
Argentine expatriate footballers
Expatriate footballers in Uruguay
Italian expatriate sportspeople in Uruguay
Copa América-winning players
Burials at La Chacarita Cemetery
Italian footballers